Adele Holness is a female dance/progressive house artist from England who was the lead vocalist on Ben Shaw's 2001 number one Billboard Hot Dance Music/Club Play track "So Strong".

References

See also
List of number-one dance hits (United States)
List of artists who reached number one on the US Dance chart

English women singers
British house musicians
Year of birth missing (living people)
Living people